Megakaryocyte-associated tyrosine-protein kinase is an enzyme that in humans is encoded by the MATK gene.

The protein encoded by this gene has amino acid sequence similarity to Csk tyrosine kinase and has the structural features of the CSK subfamily: SRC homology SH2 and SH3 domains, a catalytic domain, a unique N terminus, lack of myristylation signals, lack of a negative regulatory phosphorylation site, and lack of an autophosphorylation site. This protein is thought to play a significant role in the signal transduction of hematopoietic cells. It is able to phosphorylate and inactivate Src family kinases, and may play an inhibitory role in the control of T-cell proliferation. This protein might be involved in signaling in some cases of breast cancer. Three alternatively spliced transcript variants that encode different isoforms have been described for this gene.

Interactions
Megakaryocyte-associated tyrosine kinase has been shown to interact with CD117 and TrkA.

References

Further reading

Human proteins
Tyrosine kinases